Stikine District may refer to any of the following:

the Stikine Country, aka the Stikine District, a geographic region of the Canadian province of British Columbia, roughly equivalent to the Stikine Mining Division aka Stikine Mining District of the British Columbia Dept. of Mines
the Stikine Region, an administrative region of the Canadian province of British Columbia

See also
Stikine Plateau
Regional District of Kitimat–Stikine
Stikine (disambiguation)